Michael Raum (born 21 December 1965) is a German entrepreneur and founder of the Sellbytel Group GmbH.

Vita
Michael Raum founded the SELLBYTEL Group in 1988 and since then he has been responsible for the development of the leading European outsourcing specialist for sales, service, support, human resources, training and back office. Since the incorporation of BBDO Worldwide as a majority owner in 1994, Raum became a member of the management board of BBDO Germany.

In 1998 Raum started the internationalization of the company. He founded a French site and opened a service center in Lyons. In 2006 Raum sold SELLBYTEL to the German affiliated company of BBDO and increased his shares on BBDO Germany.

In March 2007 Michael Raum was assigned to the BBDO Worldwide Board with headquarters in New York City. Furthermore, he is represented in various economic boards. In his company he engages over 8,000 employees at more than 60 global locations. In 2009 he founded locations in Lisbon, Reading as well as in Toronto, Berlin and Singapore in 2010.

In 2018, Raum successfully sold Sellbytel a second time to french outsourcing company Webhelp. He currently resides in Nuremberg.

Awards
 In 1999 Michael Raum was awarded with “Entrepreneur of the Year”.

External links
 Pie chart for everybody! Portrait about Michael Raum in Handelsblatt online on August 20, 2007
 Rank 60: Michael Raum, Sellbytel Group W&V Ranking of the best agency managers 2010
 Winner Services in Manager-Magazin on June 4, 1999

German chief executives
1965 births
Living people